Armillaria altimontana is a species of agaric fungus in the family Physalacriaceae. The species, found in the Pacific Northwest region of North America, was officially described as new to science in 2012. It was previously known as North American biological species (NABS) X. It grows in high-elevation mesic habitats in dry coniferous forests.

See also
List of Armillaria species

References

External links

altimontana
Fungi of North America
Fungal tree pathogens and diseases
Pacific Northwest
Fungi described in 2012